

14001–14100 

|- id=004
| 14004 Chikama ||  || Taketo Chikama (born 1961) is a founding member of the Fukuoka Astronomical Society. His greatest pleasure as an amateur astronomer is taking photographs of many kinds of heavenly bodies. His greatest interest is his search for supernovae || 
|- id=006
| 14006 Sakamotofumio ||  || Fumio Sakamoto (born 1968) once worked as a planetarium volunteer and during observation meetings of the municipal science museum in Kitakyushu. He currently remains engaged in the spread of astronomy activities for children and local citizens. He is a member of the Fukuoka Astronomical Society || 
|- id=010
| 14010 Jomonaomori || 1993 UL || Jōmon is the Japanese Neolithic culture (14,000–300 BC) known for its sophisticated culture and pottery. Jomon remains, such as the Sannai-Maruyama site, are found largely in Aomori Prefecture || 
|- id=012
| 14012 Amedee || 1993 XG || Amedee, a small uninhabited island 30 km west of Noumea, New Caledonia. || 
|- id=014
| 14014 Münchhausen ||  || Baron Munchausen (1720–1797), German officer and adventurer || 
|- id=015
| 14015 Senancour ||  || Etienne Pivert de Senancour (1770–1846), a French essayist and philosopher || 
|- id=016
| 14016 Steller ||  || Georg Wilhelm Steller (1709–1746), German botanist, who accompanied Vitus Bering on the expedition that led to the discovery of southeastern Alaska || 
|- id=019
| 14019 Pourbus ||  || Pieter Pourbus (1523–1584) was a Dutch-Flemish Renaissance painter, sculptor and cartographer. Known primarily for his religious and portrait painting, he was also a surveyor and engineer. Name suggested by C. Leterme. || 
|- id=024
| 14024 Procol Harum || 1994 RZ || Procol Harum British progressive rock band Img || 
|- id=025
| 14025 Fallada ||  || Hans Fallada (1893–1947), German writer || 
|- id=026
| 14026 Esquerdo ||  || Gilbert A. Esquerdo (born 1976), American research assistant for the Near-Earth-Asteroid Physical Study project at the University of Western Ontario †  || 
|- id=028
| 14028 Nakamurahiroshi ||  || Hiroshi Nakamura (born 1955) is a well-known amateur astronomer in Kagawa Prefecture, Japan. || 
|- id=031
| 14031 Rozyo ||  || Rozyo Elementary School, the name of a historical school in Ishikawa Prefecture, Japan. || 
|- id=032
| 14032 Mego || 1994 XP || Japanese Princess Megohime (1568–1653), also known as Lady Tamura, the wife of Date Masamune; a cherry tree seedling planted near the Sendai Astronomical Observatory is known as the "Princess Mego Cherry Tree". || 
|- id=036
| 14036 Yasuhirotoyama ||  || Yasuhiro Toyama (born 1953) is a Japanese electronic engineer. He has developed a number of inexpensive high-performance motor drive control circuits for astronomical telescopes, including the one used for the telescope that discovered this object. || 
|- id=037
| 14037 Takakikasahara ||  || Takaki Kasahara (born 1963) is a Japanese engineer. He is in charge of maintaining the astronomical telescope system for public observatories, such as the 0.91-m reflector telescope at Mt. Dodaira, and is developing laser autofocus system for microscopes. He is sometimes asked by camera companies to write articles about astrophotography. || 
|- id=040
| 14040 Andrejka ||  || Andrea Galádová (born 1970), familiarly known as Andrejka, wife of the first discoverer. Adrián Galád. It was the first discovered minor planet at Modra Observatory. || 
|- id=041
| 14041 Dürrenmatt ||  || Friedrich Dürrenmatt (1921–1990), Swiss author || 
|- id=042
| 14042 Agafonov ||  || Konstantin Vasil'evich Agafonov (1935–1997), a well-known organizer of the electronic industry in Russia || 
|- id=046
| 14046 Keikai ||  || Keikai mountain (height 294 meters) is located in the north of Nanyo-city, Yamagata prefecture. The Nanyo Citizen Observatory is located there || 
|- id=047
| 14047 Kohichiro ||  || Kohichiro Morita (1954–2012), a professor at the National Astronomical Observatory of Japan. || 
|- id=054
| 14054 Dušek || 1996 AR || Jiří Dušek (born 1971), Czech astronomer the Nicolas Copernicus Observatory and Planetarium in Brno. He is a co-founder of the Czech Internet astronomical newspaper IAN. || 
|- id=056
| 14056 Kainar ||  || Josef Kainar (1917–1971), Czech poet, dramatist, journalist and musician || 
|- id=057
| 14057 Manfredstoll ||  || Manfred Stoll (born 1938), Austrian astronomical computer specialist from Vienna || 
|- id=060
| 14060 Patersonewen ||  || Paterson Ewen (1925–2002), Canadian astronomical artist and teacher || 
|- id=061
| 14061 Nagincox ||  || Nagin Cox (born 1965) is a system engineer and a manager on multiple interplanetary robotic NASA missions. || 
|- id=062
| 14062 Cremaschini ||  || Claudio Cremaschini (born 1984), an amateur astronomer in Brescia, Italy || 
|- id=065
| 14065 Flegel ||  || Mike Flegel (born 1955), amateur astronomer and member of the Royal Astronomical Society of Canada †  || 
|- id=068
| 14068 Hauserová ||  || Eva Hauserová (born 1954), Czech writer and journalist || 
|- id=069
| 14069 Krasheninnikov ||  || Stepan Krasheninnikov (1711–1755), Russian geographer and anthropologist || 
|- id=071
| 14071 Gadabird ||  || Bonnie Bird (born 1947) and Andreas Gada (born 1952), Canadian amateur astronomers †  || 
|- id=072
| 14072 Volterra || 1996 KN || Vito Volterra (1860–1940), Italian mathematician and physicist || 
|- id=074
| 14074 Riccati || 1996 NS || The family of Italian mathematicians of Jacopo Francesco Riccati (1676–1754) and his sons Vincenzo (1707–1775), Giordano (1709–1790) and Francesco (1718–1791) wrote principally on differential equations, geometry and the work of Newton. Riccati's differential equation is famous. || 
|- id=075
| 14075 Kenwill || 1996 OJ || Kenneth A. Williams (born 1956), of Lake Clear, New York, an American astrometrist, astrophotographer, and discoverer of minor planets || 
|- id=077
| 14077 Volfango ||  || Wolfango Montanari (born 1931), Italian athlete at the Olympic Games in Helsinki in 1952 || 
|- id=080
| 14080 Heppenheim || 1997 GB || The medieval town of Heppenheim, Germany. On a hill above the city the ruins of the Starkenburg castle dominate the picturesque scenery. || 
|- id=088
| 14088 Ancus ||  || Ancus Marcius (c. 677–617 BC), fourth king of Rome, reigned from 640 to 616 B.C. || 
|- id=092
| 14092 Gaily ||  || T. Dean Gaily (born 1934), Canadian physicist and professor in the physics department at the University of Western Ontario || 
|- id=094
| 14094 Garneau ||  || Marc Garneau (born 1949), the first Canadian in space || 
|- id=097
| 14097 Capdepera ||  || Capdepera, a village in eastern Mallorca, Spain || 
|- id=098
| 14098 Šimek || 1997 QS || Milos Simek (born 1933), Czech radio astronomer at Ondřejov Observatory || 
|- id=100
| 14100 Weierstrass ||  || Karl Weierstrass (1815–1897), German mathematician || 
|}

14101–14200 

|- id=103
| 14103 Manzoni || 1997 TC || Alessandro Manzoni (1785–1873), an Italian poet and novelist. || 
|- id=104
| 14104 Delpino || 1997 TV || Federico Ernesto Delpino (1946–2007), an astronomer at the Bologna Observatory, began his scientific career by studying x-ray and \gamma -ray sources and the microwave cosmic background. He contributed to the creation of the electronic network at the University of Bologna and participated in astronomical popularization. || 
|- id=105
| 14105 Nakadai ||  || Tatsuya Nakadai (born 1932), a prominent Japanese actor who has received awards from the Cannes, Venice, and Berlin film festivals || 
|- id=111
| 14111 Kimamos ||  || Kim Amos, 2002 DCYSC mentor. She teaches at the Mt. De Chantal Visitation Academy, Wheeling, West Virginia. || 
|- id=114
| 14114 Randyray ||  || Randy Ray, 2002 DCYSC mentor. He teaches at the Reyburn Intermediate School, Clovis, California. || 
|- id=115
| 14115 Melaas ||  || Kathleen Melaas, 2002 DCYSC mentor. She teaches at the Valley High School, Hoople, North Dakota. || 
|- id=116
| 14116 Ogea ||  || Amanda H. Ogea, 2002 DCYSC mentor. She teaches at the Episcopal Day School, Lake Charles, Louisiana. || 
|- id=119
| 14119 Johnprince ||  || John E. Prince, 2002 DCYSC mentor. He teaches at the Keystone Junior High School, San Antonio, Texas. || 
|- id=120
| 14120 Espenak ||  || Fred Espenak, American astronomer and compiler of eclipse atlases (ephemerides) †  || 
|- id=121
| 14121 Stüwe ||  || Joachim A. Stüwe (born 1958), of the Astronomisches Institut, Ruhr-Universität Bochum, has catalogued dark clouds and globules in the southern Milky Way and pioneered the development of distance determination algorithms for interstellar clouds based on automatic star counts. || 
|- id=122
| 14122 Josties ||  || F. Jerry Josties (born 1937) worked at the United States Naval Observatory for more than four decades. He managed USNO's photographic double star program and contributed to VLBI work on the determination of polar motion, earth rotation and nutation. || 
|- id=124
| 14124 Kamil ||  || Kamil Hornoch, Czech amateur astronomer †  || 
|- id=129
| 14129 Dibucci ||  || Janet DiBucci, 2002 DCYSC mentor. She teaches at the Brentwood Middle School, Pittsburgh, Pennsylvania. || 
|- id=134
| 14134 Penkala ||  || Brad Penkala, 2002 DCYSC mentor. He teaches at the Goleta Valley Junior High School, Goleta, California. || 
|- id=135
| 14135 Cynthialang ||  || Cynthia Lang, 2002 DCYSC mentor. She teaches at the Independence Home School, Yardley, Pennsylvania. || 
|- id=141
| 14141 Demeautis ||  || Christophe Demeautis, an amateur astronomer. || 
|- id=143
| 14143 Hadfield ||  || Chris Hadfield (born 1959) was selected as a Canadian astronaut in 1992, flew on space shuttle missions STS-74 and STS-100. || 
|- id=145
| 14145 Sciam ||  || Scientific American, founded in 1845, is the oldest continuously published magazine in North America. || 
|- id=146
| 14146 Hughmaclean ||  || Hugh Noel Alexander Maclean (born 1915) is an amateur astronomer in St. Catharines, Ontario, who helped found the Royal Astronomical Society of Canada, Niagara Centre, in 1960, and was president of the Niagara Centre during 1966–1968 and 1978–1979. He was employed as a shipping foreman. || 
|- id=147
| 14147 Wenlingshuguang ||  || Wenlingshuguang is the event of the first sunlight (Shuguang in Chinese) of the new millennium shining on Wenling, Zhejiang, the first geographical point on China's mainland. || 
|- id=148
| 14148 Jimchamberlin ||  || Jim Chamberlin (1915–1981) a Canadian aerodynamicist who worked on Avro Aircraft's Jetliner and Arrow projects, then moved to NASA and was involved with the Mercury, Gemini and Apollo space programs. || 
|- id=149
| 14149 Yakowitz ||  || Sidney Yakowitz (1937–1999), a professor in the systems and industrial engineering department of the University of Arizona from 1966 to 1999. || 
|- id=153
| 14153 Dianecaplain ||  || Diane S. Caplain, 2002 DCYSC mentor. She teaches at the Great Neck South Middle School, Great Neck, New York. || 
|- id=154
| 14154 Negrelli ||  || David Negrelli, 2002 DCYSC mentor. He teaches at the Paul W. Bell Middle School, Miami, Florida. || 
|- id=155
| 14155 Cibronen ||  || Cindy Bronen, 2002 DCYSC mentor. She teaches at the Andrew W. Mellon Middle School, Pittsburgh, Pennsylvania. || 
|- id=157
| 14157 Pamelasobey ||  || Pamela Sobey, 2002 DCYSC mentor. She teaches at the Keystone Junior High School, San Antonio, Texas. || 
|- id=158
| 14158 Alananderson ||  || Alan Anderson, 2002 DCYSC mentor. He teaches at the C.W. Ruckel Middle School, Niceville, Florida. || 
|- id=163
| 14163 Johnchapman ||  || John Herbert Chapman, "Father of the Canadian Space Program" †  || 
|- id=164
| 14164 Hennigar ||  || Donald M. Hennigar (1887–1951) was a Canadian amateur telescope maker and active member of the Royal Astronomical Society of Canada, London Centre. He served as vice president of the London Centre during 1936–1938. He was staff architect with the London Life Insurance Company. || 
|- id=172
| 14172 Amanolivere ||  || Amanda Olivere, 2002 DCYSC mentor. She teaches at the Engle Middle School, West Grove, Pennsylvania. || 
|- id=174
| 14174 Deborahsmall ||  || Deborah Small, 2002 DCYSC mentor. She teaches at the George Washington Carver Middle School, Miami, Florida. || 
|- id=179
| 14179 Skinner ||  || Christopher J. Skinner (1963–1997), teacher of British astronomer Ian P. Griffin, the discoverer of this minor planet. || 
|- id=181
| 14181 Koromházi ||  || Beáta Koromházi is the mother of Czech astronomer Krisztián Sárneczky, a co-discoverer of this minor planet. || 
|- id=182
| 14182 Alley ||  || Karen Alley, 2002 DCYSC mentor. She teaches at the East Middle School, Butte, Montana. || 
|- id=185
| 14185 Van Ness ||  || Michael E. Van Ness (born 1974), an American astronomer and observer for LONEOS since 1998. He is interested in archaeoastronomy and has discovered comet 213P/Van Ness. || 
|- id=186
| 14186 Virgiliofos ||  || Virgilio Fossombroni (born 1946), a teacher of Italian Literature, developed a keen interest in science in general and taught the first rudiments of astronomy to the first discoverer when he was a little boy. || 
|- id=189
| 14189 Sèvre ||  || François Sèvre (born 1948) a French astronomer who started his career as an infrared astronomy engineer at Meudon Observatory. He has participated in a large number of observing runs, most notably at the Pic du Midi Observatory, where his knowledge of the mountain and his human qualities have always been appreciated. || 
|- id=190
| 14190 Soldán ||  || Jan Soldán (born 1957) is a Czech astronomer, designer and developer of control software and programs for space and ground-based experiments, including CCD cameras, robotic telescopes and real-time image processing. Since 1996 he has taken part in the INTEGRAL satellite project. || 
|}

14201–14300 

|- id=203
| 14203 Hocking ||  || Wayne Keith Hocking (born 1955), a Canadian physicist who has studied atmospheric and radar physics and constructed radar systems. He joined the faculty at the University of Western Ontario in 1991. || 
|- id=206
| 14206 Sehnal ||  || Ladislav Sehnal (born 1931), a Czech astronomer who is known for his work on the effects of solar radiation and atmospheric drag on the motions of artificial satellites and the theory of space accelerometric measurements. He served as director of the Astronomical Institute of the Czech Academy of Sciences during 1990–1996. || 
|- id=214
| 14214 Hirsch ||  || Theresa Hirsch, 2002 DYSC mentor. She teaches at the St. John the Baptist School, New Brighton, Minnesota || 
|- id=217
| 14217 Oaxaca ||  || Oaxaca, City and State in Mexico, birthplace of Benito Juárez, first native-born president of Mexico, first numbered asteroid discovered from Mexico (updated by the discoverer) || 
|- id=220
| 14220 Alexgibbs ||  || Alex Gibbs (born 1967), an observer and software engineer with the Catalina Sky Survey. || 
|- id=223
| 14223 Dolby ||  || John Dolby (born 1961) was a telescope operator at the University of New Mexico's Capilla Peak Observatory during 1988–1989. Since 1995 he has provided consultation and technical assistance to the astronomical and biomedical communities about CCD imaging systems || 
|- id=224
| 14224 Gaede ||  || Allison Gaede, 2001 DYSC mentor. Gaede is a teacher at the Reyburn Intermediate School, Clovis, California || 
|- id=225
| 14225 Alisahamilton ||  || Alisa Hamilton, 2001 DYSC mentor. Hamilton is a teacher at the College Station Middle School, College Station, Texas || 
|- id=226
| 14226 Hamura ||  || Jay Hamura, 2001 DYSC mentor. Hamura is a teacher at the St. Andrew's Priory, Honolulu, Hawaii || 
|- id=230
| 14230 Mariahines ||  || Maria L. Hines, 2001 DYSC mentor. Hines is a teacher at the Orchard Day Home School, Ft. Wayne, Indiana. || 
|- id=232
| 14232 Curtismiller ||  || | Curtis Miller (born 1988) is a Guidance, Navigation and Control engineer for Lockheed Martin working on Natural Feature Tracking for the OSIRIS-REx Asteroid Sample Return Mission. Prior to this role, he worked as a GN&C operations engineer. || 
|- id=234
| 14234 Davidhoover ||  || David L. Hoover, 2001 DYSC mentor. Hoover is a teacher at the Middletown Middle School, Middletown, Maryland || 
|- id=238
| 14238 d'Artagnan ||  || d'Artagnan, one of the Three Musketeers || 
|- id=244
| 14244 Labnow ||  || Science teacher (MCMS) /scientist || 
|- id=250
| 14250 Kathleenmartin ||  || Kathleen B. Martin, 2001 DYSC mentor. Martin is a teacher at the Doolen Middle School, Tucson, Arizona || 
|- id=252
| 14252 Audreymeyer ||  || Audrey W. Meyer, 2001 DYSC mentor. Meyer is a teacher at the Falmouth Academy, Falmouth, Massachusetts || 
|- id=258
| 14258 Katrinaminck ||  || Katrina D. Minck, 2001 DYSC mentor. Minck is a teacher at the Manhattan Beach Middle School, Manhattan Beach, California || 
|- id=262
| 14262 Kratzer ||  || Sherri Kratzer, 2002 DYSC mentor. She teaches at the Great Valley Middle School, Malvern, Pennsylvania || 
|- id=267
| 14267 Zook ||  || Herbert A. ("Herb") Zook (1932–2001) was a planetary scientist who advanced the understanding of the interplanetary dust complex by his studies at the NASA Johnson Space Center of meteoroid orbital evolution, collisions, resonant orbit interactions, radiation pressure and electromagnetic effects || 
|- id=274
| 14274 Landstreet ||  || John Darlington Landstreet (born 1940), a Canadian astronomer at the University of Western Ontario. He helped discover magnetic fields in white dwarf stars and developed Balmer-line polarimetry for detection of magnetic fields in middle-main sequence stars. || 
|- id=275
| 14275 Dianemurray ||  || Diane K. Murray, 2001 DYSC mentor. Murray is a teacher at the J. F. Kennedy Elementary School, Butte, Montana. || 
|- id=277
| 14277 Parsa ||  || Steve Parsa, 2001 DYSC mentor. Parsa is a teacher at the Palos Verdes Intermediate School, Palos Verdes, California || 
|- id=278
| 14278 Perrenot ||  || Valerie T. Perrenot, 2001 DYSC mentor. Perrenot is a teacher at the Barbara Bush Middle School, San Antonio, Texas || 
|- id=282
| 14282 Cruijff || 2097 P-L || Johan Cruijff (1947–2016) was a legendary Dutch football player who also became successful as a football coach in the Netherlands and Spain. His Cruyff Foundation supports sports projects for disabled and disadvantaged children. The name was suggested by  || 
|}

14301–14400 

|- id=308
| 14308 Hardeman || 5193 T-3 || Sjoerd Hardeman (1982–2011) was a member of the Jongeren WerkGroep voor sterrenkunde (Dutch Youth Association for astronomy). He was a leader on several astronomy holiday camps and gave many presentations on astronomy. He died from leukemia shortly before defending his PhD. || 
|- id=309
| 14309 Defoy || A908 SA || Ilse Defoy (1892–1947), wife of Christoph Schubart and mother of Heidelberg astronomer Joachim Schubart || 
|- id=310
| 14310 Shuttleworth || 1966 PP || Mark Shuttleworth, South African businessman, first citizen of an African country to venture into space (on a Soyuz mission in 2002) || 
|- id=312
| 14312 Polytech ||  || Saint Petersburg State Technical University (former Polytechnical Institute), founded in 1899, is one of the largest universities laying the foundation of higher polytechnic education in Russia. || 
|- id=313
| 14313 Dodaira ||  || Dodaira station was dedicated in 1962 with a 0.91-m reflector and 0.50-m Schmidt telescope as a branch station of the Tokyo Astronomical Observatory in Saitama prefecture, and its operation was terminated in Mar. 2000. It was located where the borders of Tokigawa, Ogawamachi and Higashichichibu meet. || 
|- id=314
| 14314 Tokigawa ||  || Tokigawa, a village east of the Chichibu mountain range in Saitama prefecture, north of Tokyo, near where Dodaira station was located. || 
|- id=315
| 14315 Ogawamachi ||  ||  Ogawamachi, a town at the eastern edge of Chichibu mountain range in Saitama prefecture. || 
|- id=316
| 14316 Higashichichibu ||  || Higashichichibu, a village of 4000 at the eastern edge of the Chichibu mountain range in Saitama prefecture. || 
|- id=317
| 14317 Antonov ||  || Oleg Konstantinovich Antonov (1906–1984) worked in Kiev beginning in 1952 and was the founder of a national scientific and technical school of aircraft building. He made many types of gliders, passenger and transport aircraft distinguished by the latest features and discoveries. He was also a talented poet and artist. || 
|- id=318
| 14318 Buzinov ||  || Victor Mikhajlovich Buzinov (1934–2006) was a Russian journalist and author from St. Petersburg. About three thousand of his Radio walks through the city won the recognition of citizens and promoted their civic consciousness. He wrote several books on the history of St. Petersburg that were awarded prestigious prizes. || 
|- id=322
| 14322 Shakura || 1978 YM || Nikolai Ivanovich Shakura, Russian astrophysicist || 
|- id=327
| 14327 Lemke ||  || Dietrich Lemke (born 1939), a German astronomer who is the principal investigator of the ISOPHOT instrument on board ESA's Infrared Space Observatory, has encouraged the study of minor planets in the thermal infrared, resulting in their being established as a new class of far-infrared/submillimeter calibrators. || 
|- id=328
| 14328 Granvik || 1980 VH || Mikael Granvik (born 1977), a researcher at the University of Helsinki and senior research scientist, Finnish Geodetic Institute. || 
|- id=335
| 14335 Alexosipov ||  || Alexandr Kuzmich Osipov (1920–2004) was a Ukrainian astronomer at the Astronomical Observatory of Kyiv National University. He was a talented teacher of many generations of students. His interests were wide-ranging, from observations of artificial satellites to studies of the motion and the figure of the moon, planets and comets. || 
|- id=338
| 14338 Shibakoukan ||  || Shiba Koukan (1747–1818) was a western-style painter in the late Edo period || 
|- id=339
| 14339 Knorre || 1983 GU || Ernest Khristov Knorre (1759–1810) was the first astronomer at Tartu University. His son Karl Khristov Knorre (1801–1883) was the first director of the naval Nikolaev Observatory. Victor Karlovich Knorre (1840–1919) worked in Nikolaev, Pulkovo and Berlin and discovered (158) Koronis and three other minor planets || 
|- id=342
| 14342 Iglika || 1984 SL || Iglika Manchev (born 1992), the guiding star of her father Christo, a good friend of the discoverers. || 
|- id=345
| 14345 Gritsevich || 1985 PO || Maria Gritsevich (born 1977), a research scientist at the Finnish Geodetic Institute. || 
|- id=346
| 14346 Zhilyaev ||  || Boris Efimovich Zhilyaev (born 1940) is a Ukrainian astronomer and chief of the high-speed photometry group at the main astronomical observatory of the National Academy of Sciences of Ukraine. He has organized an international network of synchronized HSPh telescopes to detect microsecond stellar variations at a level down to 0.001 magnitude. || 
|- id=348
| 14348 Cumming ||  || Robert Cumming (born 1967), an astronomer at Onsala Space Observatory. || 
|- id=349
| 14349 Nikitamikhalkov ||  || Nikita Sergeyevich Mikhalkov (born 1945), Russian film director and has also acted in more than 40 films. He received awards from Cannes and Venice, and won an Oscar for the Best Foreign Film, Burnt by the Sun (1994). Since December 1997, he has been chairman of the Cinematographers' Union of Russia. || 
|- id=351
| 14351 Tomaskohout ||  || Tomas Kohout (born 1980), a postdoctoral researcher at the University of Helsinki. || 
|- id=354
| 14354 Kolesnikov ||  || Evgeny Kolesnikov, Russian scientist who has conducted research at the Tunguska impact site || 
|- id=360
| 14360 Ipatov ||  || Sergej Ivanovich Ipatov (born 1952) is a Russian scientist and specialist in the migration of minor planets. During his stay in 1999 at the Uccle Observatory, he was shown to be a very fine observer who made several discoveries with the Uccle Schmidt telescope. || 
|- id=361
| 14361 Boscovich || 1988 DE || Ruggiero Giuseppe Boscovich (1711–1787), Jesuit professor of mathematics and philosophy at Rome and Pavia.  || 
|- id=365
| 14365 Jeanpaul ||  || Jean Paul (Friedrich Richter, 1763–1825), a German writer and poet. || 
|- id=366
| 14366 Wilhelmraabe ||  || Wilhelm Raabe (Jacob Corvinus, 1831–1910), The Lower-Saxon novelist and poet. || 
|- id=367
| 14367 Hippokrates ||  || Hippokrates (460?-375 B.C.), a Greek physician. || 
|- id=372
| 14372 Paulgerhardt ||  || Paul Gerhardt (1607–1676), a German poet and theologian. || 
|- id=382
| 14382 Woszczyk ||  || Andrzej Woszczyk (1935–2011), was a Polish astronomer, professor of astrophysics and chair of astronomy and astrophysics of the Toruń Center for Astronomy at the Nicolaus Copernicus University. || 
|- id=395
| 14395 Tommorgan ||  || Thomas H. Morgan, a U.S. planetary scientist. || 
|- id=400
| 14400 Baudot ||  || Jean-Maurice-Emile Baudot (1845–1903) invented a telegraphic code in 1874 that encoded each letter of the alphabet as a series of "on-or-off" signals. Because each signal has the same duration, this system is more efficient than Morse code, and it still used in telecommunications today. || 
|}

14401–14500 

|-
| 14401 Reikoyukawa || 1990 XV || Reiko Yukawa (born 1936) is a Japanese music critic, songwriter and translator. She is known for her work as a jazz critic for "Swing Journal" and as a radio disc jockey. || 
|- id=403
| 14403 de Machault ||  || Guillaume de Machault (c. 1300–1377), a medieval poet and one of the last poet-musicians. || 
|- id=411
| 14411 Clérambault ||  || Louis-Nicolas Clérambault (1676–1749), a composer of music for organ and harpsichord, was organist at several places in Paris. The uncontested master of the French cantata, he is particularly well known for his sonatas for violin and basso continuo || 
|- id=412
| 14412 Wolflojewski ||  || Wolf von Lojewski, a prominent journalist, book author and long-standing correspondent of the German TV system ZDF in Europe and abroad. || 
|- id=413
| 14413 Geiger ||  || Hans Geiger, German physicist. || 
|- id=420
| 14420 Massey || 1991 SM || Steven (Steve) Massey (born 1962), a pioneer in the use of modern video cameras in astronomical imaging. || 
|- id=424
| 14424 Laval ||  || Université Laval, Québec, Canada, oldest university of North America †  ‡  || 
|- id=425
| 14425 Fujimimachi ||  || Fujimimachi is a health resort town in central Japan known for its beautiful scenery and clean air. Mt. Nyukasa station, where this minor planet was discovered, is located in this town. || 
|- id=426
| 14426 Katotsuyoshi ||  || Tsuyoshi Kato (born 1968) is one of the leading amateur astronomers in Saitama prefecture. || 
|- id=428
| 14428 Lazaridis ||  || Mike Lazaridis, Canadian entrepreneur and founder of the Perimeter Institute †  || 
|- id=429
| 14429 Coyne || 1991 XC || George Coyne (born 1933), S.J., an astronomer at the Vatican Observatory since 1969. || 
|- id=436
| 14436 Morishita ||  || After Yoko Morishita (born 1947) retired from the medical field in 2007, she decided to nurture her interest in astronomy. She is an enthusiastic supporter of activities at the Astronomical Society of Shikoku, making many contributions there to furthering the spread of astronomical awareness. || 
|- id=438
| 14438 MacLean ||  || Steven Glenwood MacLean (born 1954), selected as a Canadian astronaut in 1983, is an expert in laser physics and space vision systems. He flew on space shuttle mission STS-52. || 
|- id=439
| 14439 Evermeersch ||  || Etienne Vermeersch (born 1934), a Belgian philosopher and professor. || 
|- id=441
| 14441 Atakanoseki || 1992 SJ || Atakanoseki, a checkpoint set up in Komatsu-city, Ishikawa Prefecture, in 1187. In the 400-year-old Kabuki play "Kanjincho"', two historical figures (Minamotono Yoshitsune, a great warrior, and Benkei, a brave monk) went through Atakanoseki in disguise to the northeastern part of Japan. || 
|- id=443
| 14443 Sekinenomatsu || 1992 TV || Recognized as a special natural treasure that is estimated to be over 370 years old, the six-meter-high pine tree of Sekine is located in the San-nohe town, Aomori Prefecture. || 
|- id=445
| 14445 Koichi ||  || Koichi Nishimura (born 1943) is the chairman of the telescope manufacturing company that bears his name. Nishimura began manufacturing reflecting telescopes in 1926. Since then, their telescopes have been installed in science museums and astronomical observatories throughout Japan. || 
|- id=446
| 14446 Kinkowan ||  || Kinkowan (Kagoshima Bay) in Kagoshima Prefecture, Japan. Mount Sakurajima, a famous active volcano, is in the centre of Kinkowan †  || 
|- id=447
| 14447 Hosakakanai || 1992 VL || Kanai Hosaka (1896–1937) was a Japanese astronomer. In 1910, he showed his drawing of 1P/Halley to Kenji Miyazawa (1896–1933) with the words, "The comet was like a night train going along the Milky Way". This probably inspired Kenji's best-known story "Night on the Galactic Railroad.". || 
|- id=449
| 14449 Myogizinzya ||  || Myogizinzya is a historic Shinto shrine built in 537 on the main peak of Myogi Mountain in Gunma prefecture, located in the center of the Japanese archipelago. || 
|- id=463
| 14463 McCarter ||  || David Graham McCarter (born 1946), a Canadian amateur astronomer in London, Ontario, is an indefatigable observer and a respected telescope maker who served as president of the Royal Astronomical Society of Canada, London Centre, beginning in 2000. || 
|- id=466
| 14466 Hodge ||  || Paul W. Hodge (1934–2019), was a professor of astronomy at the University of Washington and, from 1984 to 2004, was editor of the Astronomical Journal. || 
|- id=467
| 14467 Vranckx ||  || Rudy Vranckx (born 1959), a historian, has been a conflict journalist in the news department of the Flemish public service broadcaster VRT for more than 25 years. In a career, which included time spent in the Centre for Peace Studies at KU Leuven, he has reported on many conflicts all over the world. || 
|- id=468
| 14468 Ottostern ||  || Otto Stern (1888–1969), a German Jewish experimental physicist. || 
|- id=469
| 14469 Komatsuataka || 1993 RK || Komatsuataka is a seaside town in Komatsu City, Ishikawa Prefecture. || 
|- id=479
| 14479 Plekhanov ||  || Gennadij Plekhanov (born 1926) is a Russian scientist from Tomsk University who has conducted scientific investigations for 30 years at the Tunguska impact site near Vanavara. In July 1995 the discoverer accompanied him on an excursion to the Tunguska explosion area. || 
|- id=486
| 14486 Tuscia || 1994 TE || The ancient name of Tuscany. The central Italian region once inhabited by the Etruscans, and located between the Tyrrhenian Sea and the Arno and Tiber rivers. || 
|- id=487
| 14487 Sakaisakae ||  || Sakae Sakai (born 1953) is a well-known amateur astronomer. || 
|- id=491
| 14491 Hitachiomiya ||  || Hitachiomiya city, located in the northeast of Kanto district in central Japan, came on the scene in Oct. 2004 through the merger of five towns and villages. The former Miwa village area of Hitachi Omiya city is now the site of the Bistar Astronomical Observatory || 
|- id=492
| 14492 Bistar ||  || Bistar is the name of the astronomical observatory at Hanadate Nature Park in Hitachiomiya city, Ibaraki prefecture. Volunteers conduct stargazing parties at the observatory. In addition, the Mt. Hanadate Star Festival has been held there each summer since 1991 || 
|- id=498
| 14498 Bernini ||  || Gian Lorenzo Bernini, an Italian architect and sculptor who designed the colonnade of St. Peter's Basilica in Rome. || 
|- id=499
| 14499 Satotoshio ||  || Toshio Sato (born 1936), a Japanese amateur astronomer and expert on the modern history of Japanese astronomy. || 
|- id=500
| 14500 Kibo ||  || Kibo, a word meaning "hope" or "wish", became a Japanese nickname for the Experiment Module of the International Space Station. || 
|}

14501–14600 

|-
| 14501 Tetsuokojima ||  || Tetsuo Kojima (born 1945) is a Japanese amateur astronomer and an active member of Ota Astronomical Club. || 
|- id=502
| 14502 Morden ||  || James C. Morden (1869–1944) was a Canadian historian, educator and author in Stamford Township (now Niagara Falls), Ontario. Morden also had an active local political career as a member of Stamford Township Council, and a public school was named for him in 1952. || 
|- id=504
| 14504 Tsujimura ||  || Tamiyuki Tsujimura (1928–1998) was a technical staff member at the observatory of Kyoto University. He devoted himself to the development of the equipment at Ikoma and Ouda Stations || 
|- id=505
| 14505 Barentine ||  || John C. Barentine (born 1976) has served as an observing specialist at the Apache Point Observatory 3.5-m telescope and Sloan Digital Sky Survey. Trained in stellar astronomy, he was introduced to planetary work by colleagues Gil Esquerdo and Carol Neese, who suggested this name. || 
|- id=509
| 14509 Lučenec ||  || Lučenec is a small historical town in Slovakia. It is the cultural and industrial center of the Novohrad region, where the first discoverer, Adrián Galád, has spent his childhood. Lučenec dates from the thirteenth century and during its history, it has twice been razed by fire in 1622 and 1849. || 
|- id=511
| 14511 Nickel ||  || Jack Allen "Triple" Nickel (born 1949) joined the Aircraft Operations Division at NASA's Johnson Space Center in 1997. Flying the Shuttle Trainer Aircraft (STA), Nickel helps teach astronauts to land the space shuttle. He is also a keen amateur astronomer and has made a 0.20-m telescope. || 
|- id=513
| 14513 Alicelindner ||  || Alice Lindner (born 1948), German secretary at the Hoher List Observatory near Bonn, Germany. For many years she always has been very helpful in preparing the observations made at Hoher List by Eric Walter Elst who discovered this minor planet. Very reliable in her duties, she is appreciated by all colleagues at Hoher List. || 
|- id=515
| 14515 Koichisato ||  || Koichi Sato (born 1960) is a local government employee and amateur astronomer, active in the Nanyo Astronomy Enthusiasts Club since 1984 || 
|- id=517
| 14517 Monitoma ||  || Monika Pravcová (born 1976), sister of the discoverer, and Tomáš Kneslík (born 1977) fell in love in the year of the discovery of this minor planet and married in 2000 when it was numbered || 
|- id=519
| 14519 Ural ||  || The Ural river, flowing from the Ural mountains into Kazakhstan and the Caspian Sea; it forms part of the traditional boundary between Europe and Asia || 
|- id=526
| 14526 Xenocrates ||  || Xenocrates of Chalcedon (396–314 B.C.), Greek philosopher and mathematician, was a student of Plato and teacher of Epicurus. As head of the Academy (339-314 B.C.) he upheld Plato's policy that geometry and music are prerequisites to the study of philosophy. He wrote on the history of geometry and on number theory. || 
|- id=533
| 14533 Roy || 1997 QY || René Roy (born 1938), French amateur astronomer and discoverer of minor planets. He was especially interested in CCD photometry (lightcurves) and astrometry of minor planets and comets. || 
|- id=535
| 14535 Kazuyukihanda || 1997 RF || Kazuyuki Handa (born 1926) is a member of the Sakurae Tenmon Doukoukai who popularizes astronomy in Shimane prefecture. He established "Chiisana Shizenkan" (The Small Nature Museum) at Sakurae, where he spreads his message of learning through nature || 
|- id=537
| 14537 Týn nad Vltavou ||  || Týn nad Vltavou, a town on the Vltava River in Bohemia, the Czech Republic || 
|- id=539
| 14539 Clocke Roeland ||  || Clocke Roeland, the storm bell that is the symbol of the independent spirit of the Belgian (Flemish) city of Ghent || 
|- id=541
| 14541 Sacrobosco || 1997 SF || Johannes de Sacrobosco (c. 1195– c. 1256) was an English astronomer at the University of Paris, and author of the Latin treatise Tractatus de sphaera mundi (1220–1230). It was the most popular medieval textbook on the elements of astronomy and geocentric cosmology, based heavily on Ptolemy's Almagest, and was used until the 17th century. || 
|- id=542
| 14542 Karitskaya ||  || Eugenia Alexeevna Karitskaya (born 1947) is an astronomer at the Sternberg Astronomical Institute in Moscow and a specialist in the study of x-ray variable stars. Among many accomplishments, she contributed to the compilation of the General Catalogue of Variable Stars || 
|- id=543
| 14543 Sajigawasuiseki ||  || Sajigawa-suiseki is a type of special rock found in the Saji River, which runs through Saji Village. Sajigawa-suiseki is popular and well known among Japanese and is favored for use in gardening, as well as in the making of specialty tray servers || 
|- id=544
| 14544 Ericjones ||  || Eric M. Jones (born 1944) is an American astrophysicist and space historian. He incorporated the transcripts from the Apollo landings into the landmark web resource "The Apollo Lunar Surface Journal", expanding the transcripts to include annotations by the astronauts, as well as other documentation. || 
|- id=550
| 14550 Lehký ||  || Martin Lehký (1972-2020) was a Czech amateur astronomer and visual and CCD observer of comets, variable stars and minor planets. He was also interested in observations of occultations of stars by solar-system bodies, eclipses, meteors and astrophotography || 
|- id=551
| 14551 Itagaki ||  || Koichi Itagaki (born 1947), a confectionery manufacturing industry president, is also an amateur astronomer in Yamagata. He is credited with the discovery of supernovae 2001bq and 2001gd || 
|- id=555
| 14555 Shinohara || 1997 VQ || Tomoe Shinohara (born 1979), a Japanese TV entertainer and designer, whose favorite hobby is astronomical observation and astrophotography. || 
|- id=558
| 14558 Wangganchang ||  || Ganchang Wang (1907–1998) was one of the founders of the researches on nuclear physics, cosmic-ray and particle physics in China. He became a member of the Chinese Academy of Sciences in 1955 || 
|- id=564
| 14564 Heasley ||  || James N. Heasley (born 1947), an American astronomer who completed his Ph.D. at Yale University in 1973 and studies stellar pulsations and populations at the Institute for Astronomy in Honolulu. || 
|- id=566
| 14566 Hokuleʻa ||  || Hōkūleʻa is the Hawaiian word for the star Arcturus. It is also the name of a double-hulled sailing canoe used to retrace ancient ocean crossings of the ancestral Hawaiians, who navigated using stellar observations || 
|- id=567
| 14567 Nicovincenti ||  || Nicole Vincenti, 2002 DYSC mentor. She teaches at the Fairmont Elementary, Sanger, California || 
|- id=568
| 14568 Zanotta || 1998 OK || Mauro Vittorio Zanotta (born 1963), Italian amateur astronomer from Milan, co-discoverer of comet C/1991 Y1 (Zanotta–Brewington) and AAVSO member Src, Src || 
|- id=570
| 14570 Burkam ||  || Ann Burkam, 2002 DYSC mentor. She teaches at the Buckeye Valley Middle School, Delaware, Ohio || 
|- id=571
| 14571 Caralexander ||  || Carolyn Alexander, 2002 DYSC mentor. She teaches at the Applegate Middle School, Applegate, Oregon || 
|- id=572
| 14572 Armando ||  || Armando Blanco (born 1950) is head of the department of physics of University of Lecce. Blanco has studied spectral properties of solar system bodies and interstellar and circumstellar dust grains || 
|- id=573
| 14573 Montebugnoli ||  || Stelio Montebugnoli (born 1948) is chief engineer in charge of the Medicina Radiotelescope Station. In Dec. 2001, he successfully collaborated in the first intercontinental planetary radar experiment in Italy, in which echoes were received from (33342) 1998 WT 24 || 
|- id=574
| 14574 Payette ||  || Julie Payette (born 1963), a Canadian astronaut who flew with the space shuttle Discovery on mission STS-96 to the International Space Station. Since 1992 she has been a member of the Canadian Astronaut Corps and has worked for NASA's astronaut office on robotics. || 
|- id=575
| 14575 Jamesblanc ||  || James Blanc mentored, 2002 DYSC mentor. He teaches at the Blennerhassett Junior High, Parkersburg, West Virginia || 
|- id=576
| 14576 Jefholley ||  || Jeffrey Holley, 2002 DYSC mentor. He teaches at the St. Peter Chanel Interparochial School, Paulina, Louisiana || 
|- id=582
| 14582 Conlin ||  || Kimberly Conlin, 2002 DYSC mentor. She teaches at the Rocky Mountain Middle School, Heber, Utah || 
|- id=583
| 14583 Lester ||  || Virginia Lester, 2002 DYSC mentor. She teaches at the Austin Academy for Excellence, Garland, Texas || 
|- id=584
| 14584 Lawson ||  || Melissa Lawson, 2002 DYSC mentor. She teaches at the Hastings Middle School, Upper Arlington, Ohio || 
|- id=588
| 14588 Pharrams ||  || Stacey Pharrams, 2002 Discovery Channel Young Scientist Challenge mentor. She teaches at the Carnegie Mellon University, Pittsburgh, Pennsylvania. || 
|- id=589
| 14589 Stevenbyrnes ||  || Steven J. F. Byrnes (born 1984), 2003 Inter STS finalist. He attends the Roxbury Latin School, West Roxbury, Massachusetts. || 
|- id=593
| 14593 Everett ||  || Everett Gibson (born 1940), a planetary geochemist at the NASA Johnson Space Center, concentrates on the abundances, distributions and isotopic compositions of the volatile elements in lunar samples and meteorites. He co-led the team that discovered possible relic biogenic activity in the martian meteorite ALH84001 || 
|- id=594
| 14594 Jindrašilhán ||  || Jindřich Šilhán (1944–2000) a Czech astronomer who was a major contributor to the development of visual observations in Czechia and Slovakia. He observed eclipsing binaries and organized a program to monitor them. His former students are some of the leaders of public observatories. || 
|- id=595
| 14595 Peaker ||  || Brian Ronald Peaker (born 1959) is a Canadian competitive rower from London, Ontario, who represented Canada with distinction at numerous international events. Peaker and his crew mates won a silver medal at the 1996 Atlanta Olympics and a gold medal at the 1993 World Championships in the Czech Republic. || 
|- id=596
| 14596 Bergstralh ||  || Jay T. Bergstralh (born 1943) is a planetary astronomer whose studies have comprised both spectroscopic observations and modeling of planetary atmospheres. He has served at NASA headquarters, where he contributed significantly to shaping the Discovery planetary exploration program. || 
|- id=597
| 14597 Waynerichie ||  || R. Wayne Richie (born 1942) is a NASA engineer who has worked with both human and robotic space exploration. As Discovery program acquisition manager, he helped shape the technical, cost and risk assessment procedures in the selection process for the Discovery planetary exploration program || 
|- id=598
| 14598 Larrysmith ||  || Larry W. Smith (born 1952) is a mechanical engineer, firefighter and paramedic who contributed to the fire containment during the 1989 Phillips chemical plant explosion, leading the initial rescue efforts and first recovery team into the structure || 
|- id=600
| 14600 Gainsbourg ||  || Serge Gainsbourg (1928–1991) was a songwriter and an iconic figure in French music. His most famous song is Sous le soleil exactement || 
|}

14601–14700 

|- id=605
| 14605 Hyeyeonchoi ||  || Hyeyeon Choi (born 1984), 2003 Inter STS finalist. She attends the Half Hollow Hills High School East, Dix Hills, New York. || 
|- id=606
| 14606 Hifleischer ||  || Hilary Caren Fleischer (born 1985), 2003 Inter STS finalist. She attends the South Side High School, Rockville Centre, New York. || 
|- id=611
| 14611 Elsaadawi ||  || Nawal El Saadawi (1931–2021), a medical doctor, graduated from the University of Cairo, and writer. || 
|- id=612
| 14612 Irtish ||  || Irtish river, flowing from the Mongolian Altay Mountains of China into Kazakhstan and Russia before joining the Ob river || 
|- id=613
| 14613 Sanchez ||  || Christian Sanchez is editor-in-chief of the French astronomy magazine Pulsar. A very nice and gentle person, he has worked with very little help to produce over 100 issues of a magazine that always contains much useful information for the amateur astronomer || 
|- id=616
| 14616 Van Gaal ||  || Hendrik Van Gaal (1916–1998) was a Belgian priest and the founder of Urania, the public observatory of Antwerp. Van Gall strongly felt that religious institutions should not take a defensive attitude against, but rather encourage, science. The name was suggested by E. Goffin and M. Gyssens. || 
|- id=617
| 14617 Lasvergnas ||  || Olivier Las Vergnas (born 1954), French Astronomer, creator of the Association astronomique de Paris en Sorbonne in 1970 and currently president of the French Astronomical Association. || 
|- id=619
| 14619 Plotkin ||  || Howard Plotkin (born 1941) is a Canadian historian of science who joined the faculty at the University of Western Ontario and focused on astronomy. || 
|- id=621
| 14621 Tati ||  || Jacques Tati (1908–1982), French comic genius, film writer, director and actor, is famous for comedy farces such as Jour De Fête (1946), rich with sound effects but virtually free of dialogue. His brilliant characterization of the quirky Mr. Hulot places him alongside the greats Chaplin and Keaton. || 
|- id=622
| 14622 Arcadiopoveda ||  || Arcadio Poveda (born 1930) is a Mexican astronomer and a founder of a number of Mexican scientific institutions. He is best known for his pioneering work on determining the masses of elliptical galaxies || 
|- id=623
| 14623 Kamoun ||  || Paul G. D. Kamoun (born 1953) has studied the radar detectability of comets. Using the 12.6-cm wavelength radar at Arecibo, he succeeded in detecting, for the first time, the nuclei of 2P/Encke (in 1980) and 26P/Grigg-Skjellerup (in 1982). The name was suggested by P. Michel || 
|- id=624
| 14624 Prymachenko ||  || Maria Prymachenko (1909–1998) was a prolific Ukrainian artist who mainly expressed herself in the naïve style of painting. She was also an accomplished embroiderer and potter. The name was suggested by K. I. Churyumov || 
|- id=627
| 14627 Emilkowalski || 1998 VA || Emil Kowalski (1918–1994) of Syosset, New York, though not a scientist himself, encouraged and fostered the discoverer's childhood interest in observational astronomy and space technology. || 
|- id=631
| 14631 Benbryan ||  || Ben H. Bryan (born 1980) is the Lockheed Martin floor lead for the OSIRIS-REx Asteroid Sample Return Mission. He was also the lead manufacturing engineer for the OSIRIS-REx structure, a role he also performed on the Orion heat shield. || 
|- id=632
| 14632 Flensburg ||  || Situated at the end of the beautiful firth, Flensburg is the most northern city in Germany. It is a bilingual town at the Danish border and hometown of the discoverer, who lived there for more than 20 years || 
|- id=643
| 14643 Morata ||  || Didier (born 1954) and Stephane (born 1977) Morata observe with a 0.30-m telescope from Martigues, in southern France. They have discovered novae in M31 and minor planets and are now undertaking spectroscopy of Be-type stars. Stephane is studying physics, and Didier is a chemist and editor of the magazine CCD et telescope || 
|- id=654
| 14654 Rajivgupta ||  || Rajiv Gupta (born 1958) is a Canadian mathematician who has been a faculty member at the University of British Columbia since 1984. He has edited the Observer's Handbook of the Royal Astronomical Society of Canada since 2001 and began a term as president of the Society in 2002. || 
|- id=656
| 14656 Lijiang ||  || Lijiang City, in the northwest of Yunnan Province in China, is in the center of the World Natural Heritage "Three Parallel Rivers of Yunnan Protected Areas" and contains the World Cultural Heritage "Old Town of Lijiang" || 
|- id=659
| 14659 Gregoriana ||  || The Pontifical Gregorian University dates its origin to the founding of the Roman College in 1551. The name was suggested by Vatican astronomer G. Consolmagno on the occasion of the 64th meeting of Meteoritical Society in Rome in Sept. 2001 || 
|- id=664
| 14664 Vandervelden ||  || Erwin Van der Velden (1966–2005), an Australian astrophotographer who was active and valued member of the Brisbane and Southern (Australian) Astronomical Societies. He developed supreme imaging techniques for planetary and deep-sky objects taken by a Digital SLR camera and a Web-Cam. || 
|- id=669
| 14669 Beletic || 1999 DC || James William Beletic (born 1956), a physicist. Asteroid awarded by Cyril Cavadore of the European Southern Observatory's Optical Detector Team, which J. Beletic led from 1994 Nov. 1 to 2000 Apr. 27. †  || 
|- id=674
| 14674 INAOE ||  || The Instituto Nacional de Astrofisica, Optica y Electronica (INAOE) is located in Tonantzitla, Puebla, Mexico, is a prominent Mexican center for research and graduate education in astronomy and astrophysics. It operates several observatories || 
|- id=678
| 14678 Pinney ||  || Stacie Pinney, 2001 DYSC mentor. Pinney is a teacher at the Annunciation Catholic Academy, Altamonte, Florida || 
|- id=679
| 14679 Susanreed ||  || Susan K. Reed, 2001 DYSC mentor. Reed is a teacher at the Bernalillo Middle School, Bernalillo, New Mexico || 
|- id=681
| 14681 Estellechurch ||  || Estelle C. Church (born 1980) is a Lockheed Martin test engineer for the OSIRIS-REx Asteroid Sample Return Mission, focusing on the integration of the guidance system and the asteroid encounter mission phase. She also worked on the Juno and MAVEN missions and as an optics engineer. || 
|- id=682
| 14682 Davidhirsch ||  || David Hirsch (born 1973) is the Lockheed Martin Flight Software (FSW) Lead and Certified Principal Engineer (CPE) for the OSIRIS-REx Asteroid Sample Return Mission. He was also the FSW CPE for the MAVEN mission and the FSW Integrator for the Phoenix Mars Lander, MRO, Juno and Genesis missions. || 
|- id=683
| 14683 Remy ||  || Jennifer M. Remy, 2001 DYSC mentor. Remy is a teacher at the Springville Middle School, Springville, Utah || 
|- id=684
| 14684 Reyes ||  || Cynthia L. Reyes, 2001 DYSC mentor. Reyes is a teacher at the Seven Springs Middle School, New Port Richey, Florida || 
|- id=693
| 14693 Selwyn ||  || Marilyn Selwyn, 2001 DYSC mentor. Selwyn is a teacher at the Tanque Verde Elementary School, Tucson, Arizona || 
|- id=694
| 14694 Skurat ||  || Sister Karen Skurat, 2001 DYSC mentor. Skurat is a teacher at the St. Rita School, Hamden, Connecticut || 
|- id=696
| 14696 Lindawilliams ||  || Linda H. Williams, 2001 DYSC mentor. Williams is a teacher at the Beech Grove Middle School, Beech Grove, Indiana || 
|- id=697
| 14697 Ronsawyer ||  || Ron Sawyer (born 1955) is a Canadian amateur astronomer who is active in the Royal Astronomical Society of Canada, London Centre, and edited the London Centre's newsletter in the late 1970s. He helped organize the Society's General Assemblies in London, Ontario, in 1979 and 2001. || 
|- id=698
| 14698 Scottyoung ||  || Scott Douglas Young (born  1971), of the Manitoba Planetarium, was director of the Alice G. Wallace Planetarium in Fitchburg, Massachusetts, during 1996–1999. || 
|- id=699
| 14699 Klarasmi ||  || Klara Evgenyevna Smirnova (1936–2003) was a renowned Ukrainian philologist. Head of the English department at Kiev Shevchenko University, she was also an amateur astronomer and obtained several images of comet 1P/Halley during 1985–1986 using the Kiev 0.20-m refractor. The name was suggested by K. I. Churyumov || 
|- id=700
| 14700 Johnreid ||  || Geologist John Barlow Reid (born 1940), a teacher for 30 years at Hampshire College, Massachusetts, has studied the earth and moon using isotopic methods. He also developed archeological evidence for slavery migration and the life and health of past populations. The name was suggested by L. A. McFadden and R. Bedell || 
|}

14701–14800 

|-
| 14701 Aizu ||  || Aizu is the westernmost third of Fukushima prefecture, Japan. || 
|- id=702
| 14702 Benclark ||  || Benton C. Clark III (born 1937), chief scientist at Space Exploration Systems of Lockheed Martin. || 
|- id=708
| 14708 Slaven ||  || Kathy Slaven, 2001 DYSC mentor. Slaven is a teacher at the Beech Grove Middle School, Beech Grove, Indiana. || 
|- id=719
| 14719 Sobey ||  || Glen Sobey, 2001 DYSC mentor. Sobey is a teacher at the Keystone Junior High School, San Antonio, Texas. || 
|- id=724
| 14724 SNO ||  || The Sudbury Neutrino Observatory (SNO) †  || 
|- id=727
| 14727 Suggs ||  || Robert Michael Suggs (born 1955) began working for NASA in 1994 and is space environments team lead in the Engineering Directorate at Marshall Space Flight Center. || 
|- id=728
| 14728 Schuchardt ||  || Maria Schuchardt (born 1955) is the data manager for the Lunar and Planetary Laboratory Space Imagery Center at the University of Arizona. She is also the LPL photographer and involved in many LPL outreach activities, including support for many NASA spacecraft missions || 
|- id=734
| 14734 Susanstoker ||  || Susan L. Stoker, 2001 DYSC mentor. Stoker is a teacher at the Edgewood Middle School, Moriarty, New Mexico. || 
|- id=739
| 14739 Edgarchavez ||  || Edgar Chavez (born 1957) is an engineer who services electron microprobes at research institutions (such as the Lunar and Planetary Laboratory at the University of Arizona) used to analyze a variety of meteorites, terrestrial rocks and manmade materials || 
|- id=741
| 14741 Teamequinox ||  || {\tt e.quinox} is a student-led organization established at Imperial College, London, that won the IEEE's 2010 "Change the World" competition. Their winning project uses their engineering knowledge to provide a sustainable rural electrification system in developing countries in a scalable and economically viable manner || 
|- id=764
| 14764 Kilauea || 7072 P-L || Kilauea, the active volcano on Hawaii. || 
|- id=789
| 14789 GAISH ||  || GAISh (ГАИШ), Moscow University's Sternberg Astronomical Institute, founded in 1931 on the site of the observatory established by the university in 1831 || 
|- id=790
| 14790 Beletskij || 1970 OF || Vladimir Vasil'evich Beletskij (born 1930), a corresponding member of the Russian Academy of Sciences and professor of Moscow University, is a prominent expert in celestial mechanics and spaceflight theory. He developed a nonlinear theory for the rotation and orientation of natural celestial bodies and artificial satellites || 
|- id=791
| 14791 Atreus || 1973 SU || Atreus was the son of Pelops, father of Agamemnon and Menelaos and brother of Thyestes || 
|- id=792
| 14792 Thyestes ||  || Thyestes was the son of Pelops and brother of Atreus. Atreus killed the children of Thyestes and gave them to Thyestes to eat. Because of this Thyestes cursed the family of Atreus || 
|- id=794
| 14794 Konetskiy ||  || Victor Victorovich Konetskiy (1929–2002) was a Russian writer who also became the captain of an ocean-going ship in the Arctic Ocean. He was the author of more than 50 well-known novels, stories and film scripts. || 
|- id=795
| 14795 Syoyou ||  || Tubouchi Syoyou (1859–1935) accomplished the first complete translation of Shakespeare's dramas into Japanese. These works inspired the first discoverer to write his book Shakespearean Star Stories || 
|}

14801–14900 

|- id=812
| 14812 Rosario ||  || Rosario, Argentina || 
|- id=814
| 14814 Gurij ||  || Gurij Timofeevich Petrovsky (born 1931), director of the Vavilov State Optical Institute and president of the Rozhdestvensky International Optical Society. || 
|- id=815
| 14815 Rutberg ||  || Filipp Grigor'evich Rutberg (born 1931), a Russian expert in electrophysics, is director of the Institute of Problems of Electrophysics in St. Petersburg. || 
|- id=818
| 14818 Mindeli ||  || Elisbar Mindeli (1910–1980), a noted expert in coal mining, was the director of the Institute of Mountain Mechanics (1973–1980) and a corresponding member of the Georgian Academy of Sciences (1979–1980) || 
|- id=819
| 14819 Nikolaylaverov ||  || Nikolay Pavlovich Laverov (born 1930), vice-president of the Russian Academy of Sciences, is an outstanding scientist, author of classical works in uranium geology and geochemistry, radiogeoecology, new energy sources and environmental protection || 
|- id=820
| 14820 Aizuyaichi ||  || Aizu Yaichi (1881–1956), a student of Japanese classical literature and a poet of Japanese 31-syllable poems. He greatly admired the poet Ryokan. || 
|- id=821
| 14821 Motaeno ||  || Motaeno-Minato was the old name of Tamashima Port, Okayama Prefecture, in the Edo period. || 
|- id=825
| 14825 Fieber-Beyer || 1985 RQ || Sherry K. Fieber-Beyer (born 1975), a post-doctoral researcher and director of undergraduate studies at the Department of Space Studies, University of North Dakota. || 
|- id=826
| 14826 Nicollier ||  || Claude Nicollier (born 1944), the first European mission specialist of NASA. || 
|- id=827
| 14827 Hypnos || 1986 JK || Hypnos, the Greek god of sleep and twin brother of death. He entered the sleep of mortals and gave them, at the bidding of the Olympians, dreams of foolishness or inspiration, depending on the individual and their divine protectors or enemies. || 
|- id=829
| 14829 Povalyaeva ||  || Marina Petrovna Povalyaeva (born 1956) is head of the program "Telephone communication for invalids" and organizer of charitable help to the children's branch of the central clinical hospital of the Simferopol area in Ukraine. She was decorated with the Order of Saint Peter and Paul and Order "For patriotism". || 
|- id=831
| 14831 Gentileschi ||  || Artemisia Gentileschi (1593–1652), an Italian painter, the only daughter of the Italian painter Orazio Gentileschi. || 
|- id=832
| 14832 Alechinsky ||  || Pierre Alechinsky, a Belgian painter. || 
|- id=833
| 14833 Vilenius ||  || Esa Vilenius (born 1974), a postdoctoral researcher at the Max Planck Institut f{ü}r extraterrestrische Physik in Garching, Germany. || 
|- id=834
| 14834 Isaev ||  || Aleksej Mikhajlovich Isaev (1908–1971), the general designer and a laureate of many awards, was involved in the construction of liquid-propellant engines for many spacecraft, space apparatus and orbital stations. || 
|- id=835
| 14835 Holdridge ||  || Mark E. Holdridge (born 1960), an operations manager at the Applied Physics Laboratory of Johns Hopkins University. || 
|- id=836
| 14836 Maxfrisch || 1988 CY || Max Frisch (1911–1991), Swiss writer and playwright. || 
|- id=843
| 14843 Tanna ||  || Tanna, the name of a railroad tunnel on the Tokaido main line, Japan, that runs for 7804 meters between Atami and Kannami || 
|- id=845
| 14845 Hegel ||  || Georg Wilhelm Friedrich Hegel, German philosopher. || 
|- id=846
| 14846 Lampedusa || 1989 BH || Italian writer Giuseppe Tomasi di Lampedusa (1896–1957) is famous for Il Gattopardo, whose fictional protagonist, Prince Fabrizio Salina, modeled on the author's own grandfather, was an amateur astronomer who discovered and named minor planets "Salina" in honor of his family and "Svelto" in memory of his favorite dog. || 
|- id=850
| 14850 Nagashimacho || 1989 QH || Nagashimacho, a town located in the northwestern part of Kagoshima Prefecture, Japan.  || 
|- id=853
| 14853 Shimokawa || 1989 SX || Yoji Shimokawa (born 1956) is a Japanese amateur astronomer. His major astronomical interest is the photography of nebula and star clusters, and he is active in organizing local star parties for amateur astronomers. || 
|- id=871
| 14871 Pyramus ||  || In classic literature, Pyramus and Thisbe are two lovers whose union is prevented by their opposing parents and whose lives end in a tragic double suicide. The two lovers are now finally united forever in the minor-planet belt. || 
|- id=872
| 14872 Hoher List || 1990 UR || The Observatory of Hoher List, in the Ardennes near Daun (Eifel), was established in 1957 by the University of Bonn. || 
|- id=873
| 14873 Shoyo ||  || Shoyo Senior High School in Takasago has departments in home economics, commercial studies and general education. Shoyo means the evergreen pine tree and the glorious sun. To be spirited, progressive, autonomous and cooperative is the motto of this comprehensive school, of which the second discoverer is a graduate. || 
|- id=876
| 14876 Dampier ||  || William Dampier, sailor and the first to circumnavigate the Earth three times. || 
|- id=877
| 14877 Zauberflöte ||  || Die Zauberflöte (The Magic Flute), opera by Wolfgang Amadeus Mozart (named on the occasion of the 250th anniversary of Mozart's birth) || 
|- id=880
| 14880 Moa ||  || A giant flightless bird of New Zealand thought to have become extinct by A.D. 1400, MOA is also the acronym of the project Microlensing Observations in Astrophysics which involves New Zealand and Japanese universities. || 
|- id=885
| 14885 Paskoff ||  || Marie-Claude Paskoff, chief editor of the astronomical journal L'Astronomie, founded by Flammarion in 1882. || 
|- id=888
| 14888 Kanazawashi ||  || Kanazawa ("Little Kyoto"), Ishikawa prefecture, Japan || 
|}

14901–15000 

|-
| 14901 Hidatakayama || 1992 SH || Hida Takayama city is located in the north of the Hida Mountains in the heart of Japan. || 
|- id=902
| 14902 Miyairi ||  || Keinosuke Miyairi (1865–1946), of Kyushu Imperial University, a pioneer in epidemiology, discovered that the snail now called "Miyairi-gai" is an intermediate host for transmission of shistosoma japonicum infection. This enabled schistosomiasis to be controlled. || 
|- id=909
| 14909 Kamchatka ||  || Kamchatka Peninsula || 
|- id=911
| 14911 Fukamatsu ||  || Daihei Fukamatsu (born 1956) is a Japanese amateur astronomer with a strong interest in the development of astronomical teaching materials. He has carried out orbital calculations for comets since joining the Fukuoka Astronomical Society in 1978. || 
|- id=914
| 14914 Moreux ||  || Théophile Moreux (1867–1954), commonly known as "Abbé Moreux", was a French astronomer and meteorologist. || 
|- id=917
| 14917 Taco ||  || Kenneth Dale "Taco" Cockrell (born 1950), an engineer and pilot with NASA from 1987 to 1990, was then selected as an astronaut and flew on space shuttle missions STS-56, STS-69, STS-80, STS-98 and STS-111. || 
|- id=919
| 14919 Robertohaver || 1994 PG || Roberto Haver (born 1961) is an Italian amateur astronomer who has been actively involved in observing and studying comets and meteors for more than 20 years. He planned a search for comet 109P/Swift-Tuttle in 1992 with the Schmidt telescope at Cima Ekar and later found prerecovery images. || 
|- id=922
| 14922 Ohyama ||  || Tetsuya Ohyama (born 1959) is a Japanese amateur astronomer skilled in the making of his own personal observatories. || 
|- id=925
| 14925 Naoko ||  || Yamazaki (Sumino) Naoko, Japanese astronaut || 
|- id=926
| 14926 Hoshide ||  || Hoshide Akihiko, Japanese astronaut || 
|- id=927
| 14927 Satoshi ||  || Furukawa Satoshi, Japanese astronaut || 
|- id=937
| 14937 Thirsk ||  || Robert Brent Thirsk, Canadian astronaut †  || 
|- id=939
| 14939 Norikura ||  || Mount Norikura (3026 m high), part of the northern Japan Alps, is an extinct volcano, located at the boundary of Nagano and Gifu prefectures. || 
|- id=940
| 14940 Freiligrath ||  || Ferdinand Freiligrath (1810–1876), a German poet who pleaded in his poetry for democratic and social reforms and for liberty. Because he yearned for a national uprising, he was shadowed at times. At the end of his life, in Bismarck's time, he became a patriotic poet. || 
|- id=941
| 14941 Tomswift ||  || Tom Swift and Tom Swift, Junior, were fictional father-and-son geniuses whose scientific adventures, in successive series of novels, inspired generations of young readers throughout the twentieth century to pursue science. || 
|- id=942
| 14942 Stevebaker || 1995 MA || Steve Baker (born 1967), a key member of the Air Force Maui Optical and Supercomputing (AMOS) team. || 
|- id=947
| 14947 Luigibussolino ||  || Luigi Bussolino, Italian aerospace engineer. || 
|- id=948
| 14948 Bartuška || 1996 BA || Josef Bartuška (1898–1963) was a Czech avant-garde poet, painter, graphic artist, photographer and teacher. He also experimented with photograms and collages. In the inter-war period he belonged to the most significant artists of the South Bohemian art group, Linie || 
|- id=953
| 14953 Bevilacqua ||  || Franco Bevilacqua (born 1937) is an Italian space engineer. || 
|- id=959
| 14959 TRIUMF ||  || The Tri-University Meson Facility (TRIUMF) †  || 
|- id=960
| 14960 Yule || 1996 KO || George Udny Yule (1871–1951), statistician, lecturer at University College, London, and fellow of St. John's College, Cambridge. || 
|- id=961
| 14961 d'Auteroche ||  || Jean-Baptiste Chappe d'Auteroche (1722–1769), a French astronomer who dedicated his life to observational astronomy. He observed the 1761 transit of Venus from Tobolsk and later published his Voyage en Siberie. In 1769, he went to observe the next transit in Baja California and perished in an epidemic shortly after making his observations. || 
|- id=962
| 14962 Masanoriabe ||  || Masanori Abe (born 1958) became a member of the Nanyo Astronomical Lovers Club in 1987 and actively popularizes astronomy || 
|- id=963
| 14963 Toshikazu ||  || Toshikazu Kanno (born 1959), a science teacher in junior high-school, has been a member of the Nanyo Astronomical Lovers Club since 1987 and actively popularizes astronomy || 
|- id=964
| 14964 Robertobacci || 1996 VS || Roberto Bacci (born 1965), an active Italian amateur astronomer since his adolescence, has turned his primary interest to variable stars and meteors. || 
|- id=965
| 14965 Bonk || 1997 KC || Werner Bonk (born 1923) is a German engineer and amateur astronomer who has measured several hundred positions of minor planets. He introduced the discoverer to astrometry and provided him with assistance and encouragement for many years. || 
|- id=966
| 14966 Jurijvega ||  || Jurij Vega, Slovenian mathematician and military engineer, on the occasion of the 100th anniversary of the Jurij Vega Grammar School in Idrija, which the discoverer attended †  || 
|- id=967
| 14967 Madrid ||  || Madrid, capital city of Spain, is the birthplace and hometown of the second discoverer, Rafael Pacheco. || 
|- id=968
| 14968 Kubáček || 1997 QG || Dalibor Kubácek (born 1957) worked at the Slovak Academy of Sciences in Bratislava, where he studied the structure of cometary comae by means of image processing. He willingly taught students and friends (including the discoverers) and helped to explain to them this relatively unknown procedure. || 
|- id=969
| 14969 Willacather ||  || Willa Cather (1873–1947) was an American novelist and Pulitzer Prize-winner. Born in Virginia, she moved to Nebraska in 1883. Her early life on the prairie and sympathy for the immigrant pioneer influenced her mature years and shows in her best-known novels, My Antonia and Death Comes for the Archbishop. || 
|- id=972
| 14972 Olihainaut ||  || Olivier R. Hainaut (born 1966) is a Belgian astronomer and discoverer of minor planets who is a specialist on distant comets and trans-Neptunian objects. An active observer and recoverer of several comets, he now heads the New Technology Telescope of the European Southern Observatory in La Silla. || 
|- id=973
| 14973 Rossirosina || 1997 RZ || Rosina Rossi (born 1934), mother of the Italian discoverer Andrea Boattini || 
|- id=974
| 14974 Počátky ||  || Počátky, a town in south Bohemia, the Czech Republic, where the discoverer Miloš Tichý was born †  || 
|- id=975
| 14975 Serasin ||  || Antonietta Serasin (born 1957) is an Italian amateur astronomer who lives in Padua. || 
|- id=976
| 14976 Josefčapek ||  || Josef Čapek (1887–1945), was a Czech artist with wide interests, including painting, graphic arts and writing, authoring stories for children and coauthoring dramas together with his brother Karel. Part of his art was influenced by the growing threat posed by the fascists to Czechoslovakia in the 1930s. || 
|- id=977
| 14977 Bressler ||  || Martin Bressler (1912–2009), was an Austrian amateur astronomer who started his astrometric program on minor planets in 1982. Always eager to learn new techniques, he enthusiastically switched from photographic emulsions to a CCD in 1993. || 
|- id=980
| 14980 Gustavbrom ||  || Gustav Brom (Gustav Frkal), Czech 20th-century jazz musician, conductor, composer and singer || 
|- id=981
| 14981 Uenoiwakura ||  || Iwakura High School was established in 1897 as a private railroad high school in Ueno. || 
|- id=988
| 14988 Tryggvason ||  || Bjarni Tryggvason, Icelandic-Canadian astronaut †  || 
|- id=989
| 14989 Tutte ||  || William Tutte, Canadian mathematician †  || 
|- id=990
| 14990 Zermelo ||  || Ernst F. F. Zermelo (1871–1953), German mathematician. || 
|- id=994
| 14994 Uppenkamp ||  || Wolfgang Uppenkamp (born 1953) a German teacher of English and German literature at the Pascal-Gymnasium in Grevenbroich, North Rhine-Westphalia. He uses innovative media to inspire his students. || 
|- id=995
| 14995 Archytas ||  || Archytas (ca. 428-365 B.C.), a philosopher and mathematician of the Pythagorean school. || 
|- id=998
| 14998 Ogosemachi ||  || Ogosemachi is a Japanese town in the center of Saitama Prefecture. It is famous for Kuroyama-santaki, three waterfalls in the Prefectural Kuroyama Nature Park, and Echigo Ume Grove, one of the three famous ume groves in the Kanto district. || 
|- id=000
| 15000 CCD ||  || A charge-coupled device (CCD) is a two-dimensional array of light-sensitive microelectronic semiconductor capacitors. It is used as an imaging detector. With its high sensitivity and stability, the CCD has almost completely replaced the photographic emulsion and photomultiplier as the detector of choice in quantitative scientific work. || 
|}

References 

014001-015000